The 2021 World's Best Racehorse Rankings, sponsored by Longines was the 2021 edition of the World's Best Racehorse Rankings. It was an assessment of Thoroughbred racehorses issued by the International Federation of Horseracing Authorities (IFHA) on 25 January 2022. It included horses aged three or older which competed in flat races during 2021. It was open to all horses irrespective of where they raced or where they were trained.

Rankings for 2021
For a detailed guide to this table, see below.

Guide
A complete guide to the main table above.

References

World Thoroughbred Racehorse Rankings
2021 in horse racing